Lake Shelbyville is a reservoir located in Shelby County, Illinois and Moultrie County, Illinois created by damming the Kaskaskia River at Shelbyville, Illinois. The area that surrounds the lake is the Shelbyville State Fish and Wildlife Area. The lake is managed by the United States Army Corps of Engineers, and the wildlife is managed by the Illinois Department of Natural Resources.

$57 million was appropriated for the dam and lake project. Groundbreaking on the dam occurred May 4, 1963. Filling of the reservoir began August 1, 1970. The lake was officially dedicated September 12, 1970.

Bordering the lake are two state parks: Wolf Creek State Park and Eagle Creek State Park; and five federal campgrounds including Coon Creek, Opossum Creek, Lithia Springs, Lone Point, and Forest (Bo) Woods. There is also Wilburn Creek and Whitley Creek Recreational Area. Lake Shelbyville's shoreline is heavily wooded and subject to severe erosion. Man-made beaches are located at Dam West (Shelbyville), Wilborn Creek, Wolf Creek State Park, and Sullivan Beach. Aside from the main channel of the lake are many coves, suited for fishing. The lake is deeper than other major lakes in Illinois, so it is popular with boaters during the summer.

There are full-service marinas, resorts and campgrounds on the lake. There are three full service marinas in business: Findlay, Lithia Springs, and Sullivan Marina. Findlay Marina is located north of Marker 5 just past the bridge on the west side of the lake. Sullivan Marina and Campground is located 4 miles south of Sullivan and includes hotel suites. Lithia Springs Marina is located on the southern end of Lake Shelbvyille. Lithia Marina is a full-service marina offering covered and open slip rental with free in-slip pump outs, Wi-Fi, 6 full service fuel pumps including pump out services and water fill ups, a ship store with bait, fishing licenses, boat rental, clothing, ice, sundries, beer and a full service shop with 2 full time certified mechanics including haul out and launch services.  At one time there was a Subway restaurant here, but has been recently transformed into a new place called Nessie’s.  Nessie’s has food and assorted alcoholic beverages along with outdoor entertainment in the summer time. Many people gather here to watch the fireworks on the 4th of July every year.

See also
Murder of Karyn Hearn Slover, as portions of her body were discovered in Lake Shelbyville

Carlyle Lake, as this is the other primary reservoir in the Kaskaskia River system

References

External links

Lake Shelbyville - U.S. Army Corps of Engineers
Shelbyville - State Fish and Wildlife Area
Lake Shelbyville - Shelby County Tourism/Lake Shelbyville Area CVB

Protected areas of Moultrie County, Illinois
Protected areas of Shelby County, Illinois
Shelbyville
Bodies of water of Moultrie County, Illinois
Bodies of water of Shelby County, Illinois
1970 establishments in Illinois